Geryon trispinosus is a species of crab that lives in deep water in the north-eastern Atlantic Ocean.

Description
The carapace is roughly hexagonal in shape, and reddish brown in colour. It is broader than it is long, with three conspicuous teeth on either side at the front. The pereiopods are paler than the carapace; they are quite narrow and long, with the third and fourth pairs being the longest.

Distribution
Geryon trispinosus is found in the north-eastern Atlantic Ocean. Its range extends from Norway in the north to the Bay of Biscay in the south, and also includes the Canary Islands.

Life cycle and ecology

G. trispinosus occurs in the same localities as the squat lobster Munida sarsi. Another squat lobster, M. tenuimana, lives at greater depths, but in much lower numbers, and therefore does not impact the survival of G. trispinosus as severely.

Taxonomy
Geryon trispinosus was first described in 1803 by Johann Friedrich Wilhelm Herbst, as "Cancer trispinosus", although he described the locality erroneously as the East Indies. In 1837, Henrik Nikolai Krøyer erected the genus Geryon, setting "Geryon tridens" as the type species. This was later synonymised with Herbst's species. In 1989, Raymond B. Manning and Lipke Holthuis erected a new genus, Chaceon, to accommodate most of the species previously in Geryon, which was left with only two species, G. trispinosus and G. longipes from the Mediterranean Sea.

References

Portunoidea
Crustaceans of the Atlantic Ocean
Crustaceans described in 1803